James Lee Herdt (born February 12, 1947) is a retired senior sailor in the United States Navy who served as the ninth Master Chief Petty Officer of the Navy from March 27, 1998, to April 22, 2002.

Early life and education
A native of Casper, Wyoming, Herdt enlisted in the United States Navy in 1966.

Naval career

After leaving active duty in 1974, Herdt enlisted in the United States Navy Reserve, serving in various Selected Naval Reserve units while attending Kansas State University. Returning to active duty in 1976, he served as a Naval Reserve Recruiter in Milwaukee, Wisconsin, and in 1978 rejoined the regular navy.

He has served as Command Master Chief at Nuclear Field "A" School, Orlando, Florida, on board , and at Naval Training Center, Great Lakes, Illinois. In 1996, he was selected to serve and as the Chief of Naval Education and Training Force Master Chief. He was sworn in as the ninth Master Chief Petty Officer of the Navy on March 27, 1998.

On March 10, 2000, the first MCPON, Delbert Black, was buried at Arlington National Cemetery. Herdt, who was just beginning his enlistment during Black's tour as MCPON, delivered the eulogy.

Awards and decorations
Herdt is a graduate of the United States Navy Senior Enlisted Academy and United States Army Sergeants Major Academy. He has earned a Master of Business Administration degree with a concentration in human resources management from Florida Institute of Technology in 1992. He is "triple qualified" (authorized to wear the Enlisted Aviation Warfare Specialist, Enlisted Surface Warfare Specialist, and Enlisted Submarine Warfare Specialist breast insignias). Herdt is also certified as a Master Training Specialist.
 Enlisted Submarine Warfare Specialist insignia
 Enlisted Surface Warfare Specialist insignia
 Enlisted Aviation Warfare Specialist insignia
 Master Chief Petty Officer of the Navy Identification Badge

 Eight gold service stripes.

References

1947 births
Living people
Florida Institute of Technology alumni
Master Chief Petty Officers of the United States Navy
People from Casper, Wyoming
Recipients of the Navy Distinguished Service Medal
American Security Council Foundation